Marvin Ducksch (born 7 March 1994) is a German professional footballer who plays as a striker for Werder Bremen.

Club career

Early career
Ducksch began playing football at the age of four and was enrolled at the academy of BSV Fortuna Dortmund 58 in 1998, where he was initially trained by his father, Klaus Ducksch, who was the coach of the club at the time. In the 2002–03 season Ducksch was scouted by Borussia Dortmund and enrolled into the Borussia Dortmund academy at the age of eight.

Borussia Dortmund
Ducksch is regarded as one of the great hopeful talents of the BVB academy system and while he was enrolled in the BVB academy, he showed his good goal instinct and sharp goal scoring; in the first half of the 2011–12 season playing with the BVB academy U-19, Ducksch played 26 games and scored 16 goals.

In the second half of the 2011–12 season, Ducksch was promoted to Dortmund's second team and played his first match with Borussia Dortmund II on 28 January 2012 in a 2–1 victory over the second team of Bayer Leverkusen in the Regionalliga West. After playing a few matches with Borussia Dortmund II in the Regionalliga, Ducksch scored seven goals in five consecutive games scoring braces each against Fortuna Köln, SV Elversberg and single goals against Mainz 05 II, 1. FC Köln II and Eintracht Frankfurt II. Borussia Dortmund II secured promotion to the 3. Liga.

In the 2012–13 season, Ducksch made his professional football debut on 3 August 2012 in a Borussia Dortmund II match against Alemannia Aachen in the 2012–13 3. Liga season, and on 18 May 2013, Ducksch scored the only goal in Borussia Dortmund II's 1–0 away victory against the second team of VfB Stuttgart.

In the 2013–14 Bundesliga season, Ducksch was inducted into the Borussia Dortmund first team and on 3 August 2013, in Borussia Dortmund's first round match of the 2013–14 DFB-Pokal and 3–0 victory over SV Wilhelmshaven he scored his first goal for the senior team in his first match for Borussia Dortmund.

In June 2014 he was loaned to SC Paderborn for the 2014–15 season.

FC St. Pauli
On 15 June 2016, Ducksch joined 2. Bundesliga side FC St. Pauli signing a three-year contract until 2019. His unveiling made international headlines when Ewald Lienen, the St. Pauli manager at the time, was unable to make it to the event, so a man in a Lienen mask appeared instead.

Holstein Kiel loan
In January 2017, Ducksch joined Holstein Kiel on loan for the second half of the season. In 17 matches, he scored five goals and made four assists contributing to Holstein's promotion to the 2. Bundesliga. In June, his loan was extended for the 2017–18 season. He finished the 2017–18 season with 18 goals and 12 assists in 33 matches while Holstein Kiel finished in third place but missed out on promotion to the Bundesliga in the relegation playoffs.

Fortuna Düsseldorf
In June 2018, Ducksch joined Fortuna Düsseldorf, newly promoted to the Bundesliga, on a four-year contract.

Hannover 96
After only one year at Düsseldorf, it was confirmed on 28 June 2019, that Ducksch had joined Hannover 96 on a three-year contract.

Werder Bremen
On 25 August 2021, Ducksch transferred to Werder Bremen, signing a three-year contract. Four days later, he scored a brace on his debut, a 3–0 win against Hansa Rostock in the 2. Bundesliga.

International career
Ducksch played in 2009 and 2010 for the U15 and U16 Germany youth national teams. He debuted for the Germany U17 on 4 September 2010 in an international friendly in Stadthagen against Azerbaijan. Ducksch represented the Germany U17 at the 2011 UEFA European Under-17 Football Championship where Germany finished runner-up in Serbia. In 2011, he represented the Germany U17 team at the 2011 FIFA U-17 World Cup in which Germany secured a third-place finish in Mexico. Ducksch scored in the group stage of the 2011 FIFA U-17 World Cup against Ecuador, and then scored once again in the team's 4–0 win in the second round of the 2011 FIFA U-17 World Cup against the United States; Ducksch's teammate Koray Günter also scored in the German 4–0 victory.

Career statistics

Club

Honours
Germany U17
UEFA European Under-17 Football Championship runners-up: 2011
FIFA Under-17 World Cup third place: 2011

Individual
2. Bundesliga top scorer: 2017–18

References

External links
 
 
 
 

1994 births
Living people
Footballers from Dortmund
German footballers
Association football forwards
Germany youth international footballers
Borussia Dortmund II players
Borussia Dortmund players
SC Paderborn 07 players
FC St. Pauli players
Holstein Kiel players
Fortuna Düsseldorf players
Hannover 96 players
SV Werder Bremen players
Bundesliga players
2. Bundesliga players
3. Liga players
Regionalliga players